The LVG C.VI was a German two-seat reconnaissance and artillery spotting aircraft used during World War I.

Development
The aircraft was designed by Willy Sabersky-Müssigbrodt and developed by Luft-Verkehrs-Gesellschaft (LVG) in 1917. The C.VI was a further development of the C.V, which Sabersky-Müssigbrodt had made for his former employer DFW. It was lighter, smaller and aerodynamically refined, although its fuselage seemed more bulky. It was a biplane of mixed, mostly wooden construction. It featured a semi-monocoque fuselage, plywood covered. Rectangular wings of wooden and metal construction, canvas covered. Upper wing of slightly greater span, shifted some 25 cm (10 in) towards front. Vertical fin plywood covered, rudder and elevators of metal frame canvas covered, stabilizers (tailplanes) of wooden frame canvas covered. Straight uncovered engine in the fuselage nose, with a chimney-like exhaust pipe. Two-blade Benz wooden propeller, 2.88 m (9.45 ft) diameter. Flat water radiator in central section of upper wing. Fixed conventional landing gear, with a straight common axle and a rear skid.
Aircraft were equipped with a radio (morse;send only); transmissions were by means of an antenna which could be lowered below the aircraft when needed. The crew had parachutes and heated flying suits.
A total of 1,100 aircraft of the type were manufactured.

Post-war several C.VIs with passenger cabins aft of the open cockpit were converted by Raab-Katzenstein as the LVG P.I, LVG P.II and alternatively Raab-Katzenstein RK-8 Marabu.

Operational service
Most LVG C.VIs were used by the German military aviation in last operations of World War I, mostly on Western Front, for close reconnaissance and observation.

After the war, Deutsche Luft-Reederei (DLR) used several C.VIs to provide mail and passenger transport service. The Polish Air Force used several aircraft during the Polish-Soviet war, one left by the Germans, another completed from parts in 1920 and several more bought abroad.

Suomen ilmailuliikenne Oy purchased two C.VIs in 1923, from a Swedish airline that had gone bankrupt in 1922, becoming the predecessor to Aero O/Y and Finnair.

The Finnish Air Force purchased two aircraft;one destroyed in a spin in Santahamina in 1923, the other used until the end of 1924.

More than 20 were used by Lithuania, two of which survived until 1940.

Three were used in Czechoslovakia, two in Switzerland (1920–1929) and several in the USSR.

Survivors
Today, there are three surviving C.VIs. One is currently being restored at the RAF Museum in Cosford, one is on display at the Royal Museum of the Armed Forces and Military History in Belgium and the third one is at the Musée de l'Air et de l'Espace in Paris.

Operators

Belgian Air Force
SNETA

Czechoslovak Air Force

Finnish Air Force
Suomen ilmailuliikenne Oy

Luftstreitkräfte
Deutsche Luft-Reederei

Latvian Air Force

Lithuanian Air Force

Polish Air Force

Romanian Air Corps - 11 aircraft used from 1919

Soviet Air Force

Swedish Navy

Swiss Air Force

Specifications (C.VI)

See also

References

Bibliography

Further reading

External links

Lewis, Michael:  1914–18 Connections website. Restoration of Brussels Air Museum LVG CVI

1910s German military reconnaissance aircraft
Biplanes
Single-engined tractor aircraft
C.VI
Aircraft first flown in 1917